Ignacio Ramírez (born ) is a former Mexican male volleyball player. He was part of the Mexico men's national volleyball team. On club level he played for Nayarit and Cocoteros.

References

External links
 profile at FIVB.org

1976 births
Living people
Mexican men's volleyball players
Place of birth missing (living people)
Volleyball players at the 2007 Pan American Games
Pan American Games competitors for Mexico